Blind Faith is the second album of Christian rock band, Legend Seven. It was released in 1993 under the Word Records label. The band charted several hits on Christian radio from this album ("Be Still", #1 for 2 weeks, 1994; "First Love", #10, 1994; "Call on Me", #15, 1994).

Track listing
All songs written by Andy Denton and Michael Jacobs, except where noted.
 "Refuge" - 5:52
 "Burning Desire" (Denton, Jacobs, Billy Williams) - 4:58
 "Blind Faith" - 4:56
 "Calm (After the Storm)" - 5:43
 "Call on Me" - 5:40
 "Shoot Straight Johnny" (Denton, Jacobs, Randy Ray) - 4:51
 "Hold Out" (Denton, Jacobs, Williams) - 4:10
 "First Love" (Darrell Brown, Denton, Jacobs, David Batteau) - 4:52
 "Soul Surrender" (Ray, Dann Huff)- 4:51
 "Be Still" (Denton, Jacobs, Tommy Greer) - 3:54

Musicians
 Andy Denton - lead vocals
 Michael Jacobs - guitar, background vocals
 Randy Ray - bass, background vocals
 Billy Williams - drums, percussion, background vocals

Additional musicians
 Tommy Greer - keyboards, synthesizer and percussion programming
 John Catchings - cello solo on "Call On Me"
 Cheryl Rogers - acoustic piano on "First Love"
 Al "Fish" Herring - trumpet and horn
 Jim Spake - tenor sax on "Blind Faith"
 Mark "Queen Bee" Rider - sunglasses guy on "Blind Faith"

Production
 Produced by Bubba Smith

Recording
 Basic tracks engineered by Marc DeSisto at Quad Studios, Nashville, Tennessee
 Andreas Krause - Assistant Engineer
 Andreas Krause, Bubba Smith, Bert Stevens - Overdub Engineers
 Overdubs recorded at Studio 3319 and Quad Studios at Nashville, Tennessee; Classic Recording at Franklin, Tennessee; Crosstown Records at Memphis, Tennessee.
 Mixed by Marc DeSisto at Kiva Recording Studio, Memphis, Tennessee.
 Terri Argot and Gari Harwood - Mix Assistants
 Mastered by Ken Love at Master Mix, Nashville, Tennessee.

References

Legend Seven albums
1993 albums